Masato Nakamura (中村 真人, born February 2, 1982, in Gose, Nara) is a Japanese professional baseball outfielder for the Tohoku Rakuten Golden Eagles in Japan's Nippon Professional Baseball.

External links

NPB stats

1982 births
Living people
Baseball people from Nara Prefecture
Japanese baseball players
Tohoku Rakuten Golden Eagles players